The European Union (Accessions) Act 1994 is an Act of the Parliament of the United Kingdom which ratified and legislated for the accession of the Austria, Finland and Sweden to the European Union. The act also mentions Norway who did not ratify and join following a "No" vote in the 1994 Norwegian European Union membership referendum. It received royal assent on 3 November 1994.

See also
Treaty of Accession 1994
List of Acts of the Parliament of the United Kingdom relating to the European Communities / European Union

United Kingdom Acts of Parliament 1994
Acts of the Parliament of the United Kingdom relating to the European Union